Boodle's is a London gentlemen's club, founded in January 1762, at No. 50 Pall Mall, London, by Lord Shelburne, the future Marquess of Lansdowne and Prime Minister of the United Kingdom.

History 
The club was originally based next door to William Almack's tavern, in a house also run by him; the club therefore was known as Almack's. It appears to have been formed in opposition to White's (then often called Arthur's): rule 12 as originally drafted forbade any member of Almack's from membership of any other London club, 'nor of what is at present called Arthur's or by whatever Name that Society or Club may be afterwards called, neither of new or old club or any other belonging to it'. In February 1763 this rule was altered and made even more emphatic: 'If any Member of this Society becomes a Member of Arthur's or a Candidate for Arthur's, he is of Course struck out of this Society.' The record book of the new society was kept by Almack as a statement of the terms on which he agreed to provide for the social needs of the members, and it has survived amongst the records of Boodle's. 

The first entry, dated 1 January 1762, states that 'William Almack has taken the large new House West of his now dwelling House in Pall Mall for the sole use of a Society Established upon the following Rules.' Until 10 February 1762 membership was to be open to anyone signing his name in the book; thereafter election was to be by ballot, which was always to be held 'in Parliament Time' and one black ball excluded; the total membership was to be limited to 250. After 10 February the members were to appoint thirteen managers, 'each of whom are to have a power to keep order and make the Rules of the Society to be observed'; they were to serve for one year and then each manager was 'to appoint a Successor for the ensuing Year'. The rules of the society could only be changed by the unanimous vote of at least thirty members.

Eighty-eight gentlemen, none of whom appears to have been a member of White's, paid subscriptions for 1762, and the appointment of thirteen managers for the period February 1763 to February 1764 is recorded. 

In March 1764 this club appears to have been superseded by or to have divided itself into two separate societies. The reason for this rearrangement is not known, but it may have been connected with members' differing political affiliations, or with the desire of some of them to gamble more heavily than the rules of 1762 permitted. One of the two successor societies moved to No. 49, Almack's tavern, which was converted into a clubhouse; this club would go on to become Brooks's. The other successor society remained at No. 50: this was the club that would become Boodle's. Edward Boodle is known to have been in partnership with William Almack, probably between 1764 and 1768. The present Boodle's Club in St. James's Street possesses two manuscript books, each containing a list of rules and names of subscribers, each virtually identical to each other, indicating Boodle to have taken over management of this society from 1764. The rules in Boodle's books are based on those contained in Almack's book dated 1 January 1762, and many of them are copied verbatim. This similarity makes it clear that Boodle's club was either a continuation or an off-shoot under new management and slightly altered rules of the club which Almack had established in January 1762. It met in the house which the latter had occupied from January 1762 to February 1764, i.e., No. 50 Pall Mall, next door to the house (No. 49) which from 1759 to 1764 was Almack's tavern and from 1764 to 1778 housed Almack's club, before its removal under William Brooks to St. James's Street.

The partnership between Almack and Boodle probably came to an end in 1768, for in that year Boodle succeeded Almack as the ratepayer for No. 50, and in March 1768 Boodle is known to have held a sub-lease of the house from Almack. Contemporary references to the club become much more frequent. Edward Gibbon first mentions Boodle's in a letter of 18 April 1768, and he subsequently became a member of the club; starting in December 1769 he wrote much of his correspondence there, and in 1770 he was one of the managers.

Boodle died on 8 February 1772, and on 13 February it was unanimously resolved that 'Ben Harding shall succeed the late Mr. Boodle in the House and Business, and shall be supported therein'. On 22 February the residue of Edward Boodle's lease from Almack was reassigned to Harding. In spite of the change of proprietor the club continued to be known as Boodle's. It left No. 50 in 1783, following which the house was occupied by Messrs. Hammersley and Co. for a number of years, and was subsequently demolished.

Boodle's is regarded as one of the most prestigious clubs in London, and counts many British aristocrats and notable politicians among its members. It is the second oldest club in the world, with only White's being older. Boodle's Orange Fool is a traditional club dish.

Early members were opponents of William Pitt the Elder’s foreign policies relating to the Seven Years' War, and political allies of Lord Shelburne. The club is generally regarded as being aligned with the Conservative Party, with many of its current and former members holding important positions within the party, although the club is not formally tied to any political party. During the Regency era, Boodle's became known as the club of the English gentry, while White's became the club of the nobility. Four members have been awarded the Victoria Cross and Sir Winston Churchill was one of the few people to be elected to honorary membership. It is reputed that Beau Brummell's last bet took place at the Club before he fled the country to France. Today, membership is strictly by nomination and election only.

In 1782 Boodle's took over the "Savoir Vivre" club house at 28 St. James's Street, London, and has been located there ever since. The building had been designed by John Crunden in 1775. The ground floor was refurbished by John Buonarotti Papworth between 1821 and 1834.

Notable members

Thomas Blofeld (1903–1986)
Sir John Blofeld (born 1932)
Henry Blofeld, OBE (born 1939)
Colonel Claud Thomas Bourchier, VC (1831–1877)
George "Beau" Bryan Brummell (1778–1840)
Colonel John Worthy Chaplin, VC, CB (1840–1920)
Sir Winston Churchill, KG, OM, CH, TD, PC, DL, FRS, Hon. RA (1874–1965)
William Cavendish, 5th Duke of Devonshire, KG (1748–1811)
Commander Wilfred Albert (Biffy) Dunderdale (1899–1990)
Julian Kitchener-Fellowes, Baron Fellowes of West Stafford, DL (b.1949)
Ian Lancaster Fleming (1908–1964)
Rt. Hon. Charles James Fox, PC (1749–1806)
Edward Gibbon (1737–1794)
Andrew R. Hargreaves (born 1955)
John Henniker-Major, 8th Baron Henniker (1916–2004)
David Hume (1711–1776)
William Petty-FitzMaurice, 1st Marquess of Lansdowne, KG, PC (1737–1805)
Charles Lyell, 2nd Baron Lyell, VC (1913–1943)
Sir William Miles, 1st Baronet (1797–1878)
Sir William Roger Clotworthy Moore, TD, 3rd Baronet (born 1927)
James David Graham Niven (1910–1983)
Brigadier John "Jack" Profumo, 5th Baron Profumo, CBE (1915–2006)
Richard Spring, Baron Risby (born 1946)
Adam Smith (1723–1790)
Michael Angelo Taylor (1757–1834)
Field Marshal Arthur Wellesley, 1st Duke of Wellington, KG, GCB, GCH, PC, FRS (1769–1852)
John Fane, 10th Earl of Westmorland, KG, PC (1759–1841)
William Wilberforce (1759–1833)

In fiction
Ian Fleming is said to have based the Blades Club from his James Bond novels on Boodle's. However, Boodle's itself is referenced in the novels Moonraker and You Only Live Twice. 
Of J. K. Stanford's George Hysteron-Proteron, said to be a member of Boodle's, a real-life member wrote in 1944: "I see the author mentions Boodle's. I don't know if he is a member here but there are six George Proterons sitting round me in the smoking-room at the moment."
In the TV series The Avengers (episode "The Charmers") Boodle's is referenced, while in the 1998 film version, The Avengers, Boodle's is shown – Uma Thurman's Emma Peel walks in and it is said "No females have been in Boodle's since 1762". 
The club is referenced in W. E. B. Griffin and William E. Butterworth IV's novel The Double Agents, part of the Men at War series. Ian Fleming and David Niven are referenced, as well as their membership at Boodle's. While the actual story is fiction, their memberships at Boodle's and the friendship between the two and their participation in intelligence activities during World War II is factual.
The club is referenced as a pleasant retreat from the world's worries in John Whiting's 1951 play A Penny for a Song, when Breeze, manservant to Hallam Matthews, refers to a handkerchief placed over his master's face as "a curtain between you and the world. Out here, vulgar mankind – behind there, Boodles."
In Oscar Wilde's 1895 play An Ideal Husband, Sir Robert Chiltern says, "Lord Goring is the result of Boodle's Club, Mrs. Cheveley," after Lord Goring establishes that he is a bachelor. Mrs. Cheveley responds, "He reflects every credit on the institution."
In Charles Dickens's 1853 novel Bleak House, ch. XII "On The Watch", a satirical paragraph mentions the Lords Boodle and Coodle, Sir Thomas Doodle, the Duke of Foodle, etc., alluding to the famous club and thereby to the closed set of politicians and other powerful men passing power among themselves.
In Operation Crossbow (1965) Bradley (Jeremy Kemp) suggests Boodle's to Lt. Curtis (George Peppard) as a stopover after their 'spy' interviews.
In Bernard Cornwell's novel Gallows Thief, taking place in 1817, one of the characters compares Boodle's, along with White's, to the fictional Seraphim Club encountered by the protagonist.
The club is often referred to in the ITV series Downton Abbey.
In Walt Disney Pictures Jungle Cruise (film), the Jack Whitehall character MacGregor Houghton after awaking from passing out, mentions that was dreaming he was lunching at Boodle's.

See also
List of London's gentlemen's clubs

References
H.M. Colvin, A Biographical Dictionary of British Architects, 1600–1840 (1997)

Further reading

External links
 www.boodles.org Official Web Site (Member Access Only)
Architectural history, plans, and elevations – from the Survey of London online

Regency London
Gentlemen's clubs in London
1762 establishments in England
Grade I listed buildings in the City of Westminster